Linda Silas is a Canadian nurse and trade unionist. She is the president of the Canadian Federation of Nurses Unions (CFNU) since 2003.

Early life and education 
Linda Silas grew up in Dalhousie, New Brunswick, a small community on the Restigouche River. Her father worked at the Abitibi newsprint mill, and served as president of the mill workers’ union local.

Silas studied nursing at the Université de Moncton, where she graduated in 1983.

Career 
Silas worked as a nurse in emergency care, critical care, and childbirth. She soon became president of her union local. She was elected President of the New Brunswick Nurses Union, thus becoming the youngest nurses union center president in Canadian history. She remained in that position for 10 years.

In 2003, she was elected president of the CFNU, a position she still holds today.

Advocacy 
Under Silas's tenure, the CFNU remained a nonpartisan union center. However, Silas has been a vocal political actor on healthcare issues in Canada. During the COVID-19 pandemic, she repeatedly called on provincial governments to hire more health care workers.

Linda Silas is longtime advocate of universal pharmacare. She claims implementing this policy is especially urgent during a global pandemic.

Bid for CLC leadership 
On 3 January 2020, Linda Silas announced she was running to become president of the Canadian Labour Congress (CLC), Canada's House of Labour.  Her candidacy was endorsed by major Canadian trade unions such as Teamsters Canada and the Professional Institute of the Public Service of Canada. However, she terminated her campaign in March 2021.

External links 

 Bob McKeown interviews CFNU president Linda Silas about the state of nursing in Canada

References 

Université de Moncton alumni
Acadian people
People from Restigouche County, New Brunswick
Trade unionists from New Brunswick
Living people
Canadian nurses
Year of birth missing (living people)
Canadian women nurses